Touchpaper is the fifth studio album by English singer-songwriter Claire Hamill, released on 21 April 1984 by Blueprint Records, and was her first studio album in nine years following 1975's Abracadabra. The album saw her transition into a world of synthesizers, and Gary Numan of Tubeway Army played keyboards on the track "Ultra Violet Light".

Track listing
All tracks are written by Claire Hamill, except where noted.

Side one: Moon Side
 "The Moon Is a Powerful Lover" – 5:00
 "Denmark" – 3:20
 "Fools in a Storm" – 3:46
 "First Night in New York" – 4:22
 "Come Along Brave Lads" (Andy Stennett) – 3:39

Side two: Jump Side
 "Jump" – 4:05
 "In the Palm of My Hand" – 3:25
 "Gonna Be the One" – 4:03
 "Ultra Violet Light" – 2:40
 "Once Is Not Enough" – 3:31

Personnel
Credits are adapted from the Touchpaper liner notes.

Musicians
 Claire Hamill — vocals; guitar; keyboards
 Andy Stennett — keyboards
 Ron Mathewson — acoustic bass
 Neal Wilkinson — drums on "Denmark" and "In the Palm of My Hand"
 Mitch Dalton — guitar on "Denmark"
 John Rocca — percussion on "Fools in a Storm"
 Dave Roach — saxophone on "Fools in a Storm"
 Joe Partridge— guitar on "First Night in New York
 Ronnie Leahy — keyboards on "First Night in New York"
 John Giblin — bass on "First Night in New York"
 Simon Phillips — bass on "First Night in New York"
 Morris Pert — percussion on "First Night in New York"
 Paul Morgan — drums on "Come Along Brave Lads" and "Jump"
 Vincent Abbot — bagpipes on "Come Along Brave Lads"
 Peter Maas — bass on "Jump"
 John McKenzie — bass on "Gonna Be the One"
 Tony Beard — drums on "Gonna Be the One" and "Once Is Not Enough"
 Gary Numan — keyboards on "Ultra Violet Light"
 Alan White — drums on "Ultra Violet Light"
 Steve Gould — bass on "Ultra Violet Light"
 Laurie Wisefield — guitar on "Ultra Violet Light"
 Danny McIntosh — guitar on "Once Is Not Enough"

References

External links
 

Claire Hamill albums
1984 albums